Oonche Log is a 1965 Indian Hindi-language drama film directed by Phani Majumdar. It is based on the play Major Chandrakanth, by K. Balachander. The film stars Ashok Kumar, Raaj Kumar, Feroz Khan in lead roles. Its lyrics were composed by Majrooh Sultanpuri and the music was given by Chitragupta.

The film was shot at Vauhini Studios, Chennai and was also noted as the first big hit of newcomer Feroz Khan, who was noted for his sensitive performance against veterans such as Raaj Kumar and Ashok Kumar. At the 13th National Film Awards it won the award for Second Best Feature Film in Hindi.

Cast 
 Ashok Kumar as Major Chandrakant
 Raaj Kumar as  Inspector Shrikant 
 Feroz Khan as Rajnikant 
 K. R. Vijaya as Bimla Prabhu
 Kanhaiyalal as Master Gunichand 
 Tarun Bose as Mohan Prabhu

Plot 
Major Chandrakant (Ashok Kumar), who has become blind during warfare, has two sons, Inspector Shrikant (Raaj Kumar) and Rajnikant (Feroz Khan). Major Chandrakant promises his neighbour Master Gunichand (Kanhaiyalal) that he will get his daughter Pallavi married to Rajnikant. But Rajnikant falls in love with Bimla (K. R. Vijaya) during cadet training in Madras. When Bimla gets pregnant, he is not ready to accept her, due to fear of telling the truth to his father. Rajnikant asks Bimla to abort the child and returns to Madras.

Bimla commits suicide. Her brother Mohan (Tarun Bose) vows to avenge her death, and kills Rajnikant in the train. On the run from the police, Mohan takes refuge in Major Chandrakant's house and confesses that he is a professor who has, in a fit of rage, killed the man who deceived his sister.

The Major asks Mohan to stay in the attic and makes all efforts to keep him away from his elder son who is a police inspector (Raaj Kumar). When the major receives a telegram about Rajnikant's death, he realizes that Mohan is his son's murderer. He is ashamed that his son had done such a misdeed. Inspector Shrikant, on finding out the truth, arrests Rajnikant for committing the murder and the major for abetting a killer.

Soundtrack 
The film's music was created by Chitragupta with lyrics written by Majrooh Sultanpuri.

References

External links 
 

1965 films
1960s Hindi-language films
Films with screenplays by K. Balachander
Films scored by Chitragupta
Best Hindi Feature Film National Film Award winners
Fictional portrayals of the Maharashtra Police
Films shot in Chennai
Films directed by Phani Majumdar
Films with screenplays by Phani Majumdar
Indian films based on plays